The planter class, known alternatively in the United States as the Southern aristocracy, was a racial and socioeconomic caste of pan-American society that dominated 17th and 18th century agricultural markets. The Atlantic slave trade permitted planters access to inexpensive African slave labor for the planting and harvesting of crops such as tobacco, cotton, indigo, coffee, tea, cocoa, sugarcane, sisal, oil seeds, oil palms, hemp, rubber trees, and fruits. Planters were considered part of the American gentry.

In the Southern United States, planters maintained a distinct culture, which was characterized by its similarity to the manners and customs of the British nobility and gentry. The culture had an emphasis on chivalry, gentility, and hospitality. The culture of the Southern United States, with its landed plantocracy, was distinctly different from areas north of the Mason–Dixon line and west of the Appalachian Mountains. The northern and western areas were characterized by small landed property, worked by yeoman farmers without the use of slave labor.

After the American Civil War (1861–1865), many in the social class saw their wealth greatly reduced, as slavery was abolished in the United States. After emancipation, many plantations were converted to a sharecropping model with African American freedmen working as sharecroppers on the same land which they had worked as slaves before the war. During the Gilded Age, many plantations, no longer viable as agricultural operations, were purchased by wealthy northern industrialists as hunting retreats. Later some plantations became museums, often on the National Register of Historic Places.

Planters were prolific throughout European colonies in North and South America and the West Indies. Members of the class include colonists Robert "King" Carter, William Byrd of Westover; many signers of the Declaration of Independence, including Benjamin Harrison V, Thomas Nelson, Jr., George Wythe, Carter Braxton and Richard Henry Lee; several Founding Fathers, including George Washington, Thomas Jefferson, James Madison and James Monroe; Confederate leaders, including President Jefferson Davis and General Robert E. Lee; Mary Chesnut, Valcour Aime, Sallie Ward, and the fictional Scarlett O'Hara from the film Gone with the Wind (1939).

History

Background
The search for gold and silver was a constant theme in overseas expansion, but there were other European demands that the New World could also satisfy, which contributed to its growing involvement in the Western-dominated world economy. While Spanish America seemed to fulfill dreams of mineral wealth, Brazil became the first major plantation colony in 1532, organized to produce a tropical crop, sugar, in great demand and short supply in Europe. The other major powers of Western Europe soon hoped to establish profitable colonies of their own. Presented with new opportunities, Europeans who were disenchanted by the rigid social structures of feudalism emigrated to the abundant virginal lands of the colonial frontier.

Arriving in the late 16th and the early 17th centuries, settlers landed on the shores of an unspoiled and hostile countryside. Early planters first began as colony farmers providing for the needs of settlements besieged by famine, disease, and tribal raids. Native Americans friendly to the colonists taught them to cultivate native plant species, including tobacco, sugar and fruits, which, within a century, would become a global industry itself that funded a multinational slave trade. Colonial politics would come to be dominated by wealthy noble landowners interested in commercial development.

In an effort to reduce the financial burden of continental wars, European governments began instituting land pension systems by which a soldier, typically an officer, would be granted land in the colonies for services rendered. That incentivized military professionals to settle in the Americas and thus contribute to colonial defense against foreign colonists and hostile Natives.

Rise of plantation economy
John Rolfe, a settler from Jamestown, was the first colonist to grow tobacco in North America. He arrived in Virginia with tobacco seeds procured from an earlier voyage to Trinidad, and in 1612, he harvested his inaugural crop for sale on the European market. In the 17th century, the Chesapeake Bay area was immensely hospitable to tobacco cultivation. Ships annually hauled 1.5 million lb (680,000 kg) of tobacco out to the Bay by the 1630s and about 40 million lb (18 million kg) by the end of the century. Tobacco planters financed their operations with loans from London. When tobacco prices dropped precipitously in the 1750s, many plantations struggled to remain financially solvent. In an effort to combat financial ruin, planters pushed to increase crop yield or, with the depletion of soil nutrients, converted to growing other crops such as cotton or wheat.

In 1720, coffee was first introduced to the West Indies by French naval officer Gabriel de Clieu, who procured a coffee plant seedling from the Royal Botanical Gardens in Paris and transported it to Martinique. He transplanted it on the slopes of Mount Pelée and was able to harvest his first crop in 1726, or shortly thereafter. Within 50 years, there were 18,000 coffee trees in Martinique, enabling the spread of coffee cultivation to Saint-Domingue, New Spain, and other islands of the Caribbean. The French territory of Saint-Domingue began cultivating coffee in 1734, and by 1788, it supplied half the global market. The French colonial plantations relied heavily on African slave laborers. However, the harsh conditions that slaves endured on coffee plantations precipitated the Haitian Revolution. Coffee had a major influence on the geography of Latin America.

Revolution and abolitionism
An age of enlightenment dominated the world of ideas in Europe during the 18th century. Philosophers began writing pamphlets against slavery and its moral and economic justifications, including Montesquieu in The Spirit of the Laws (1748) and Denis Diderot in the Encyclopédie. The laws governing slavery in the French West Indies, the Code Noir of Louis XIV, granted unparalleled rights for slaves to marry, gather publicly, and abstain from work on Sundays. It forbade slave owners to torture or to separate families; though corporal punishment was sanctioned, masters who killed their slaves or falsely accused a slave of a crime and had the slave put to death would be fined. Masters openly and consistently broke the Code and passed local legislation that reversed its less desirable articles.

The Enlightenment writer Guillaume Raynal attacked slavery in the 1780 edition of his history of European colonization. He also predicted a general slave revolt in the colonies by saying that there were signs of "the impending storm." Sugar production in Saint-Domingue was sustained under especially harsh conditions, including the humid climate of the Caribbean, where diseases such as malaria and yellow fever caused high mortality. White planters and their families, together with the merchants and shopkeepers, lived in fear of slave rebellion. Thus, in the functions of society and efforts to combat dissent, cruelty was noted in the form of overwork, inadequate food and shelter, insufficient clothing and medical care, rape, lashings, castration and burnings. Runaway slaves, called Maroons, hid in the jungles away from civilization and lived off the land and what could be stolen in violent raids on the island's sugar and coffee plantations. Although the numbers in the bands grew large (sometimes into the thousands), they generally lacked the leadership and strategy to accomplish large-scale objectives. In April 1791, a massive slave insurgency rose violently against the plantation system, setting a precedent of resistance to slavery.

On 4 February 1794, during the French Revolution, the National Assembly of the First Republic abolished slavery in France and its colonies. The military successes of the French Republic and of Napoleon Bonaparte carried across Europe the ideals of egalitarianism and brought into question the practice of slavery in the colonies of other European powers.

The legality of slave ownership under English common law was abolished in 1772 as a result of Somerset v Stewart. In 1783, an abolitionist movement began among the British population, and that same year a group of Quakers founded the first British abolitionist organisation. William Wilberforce led the cause of abolition through his campaign in Parliament. His efforts finally abolished the slave trade in the British Empire with the 1807 Slave Trade Act. He continued to campaign for the abolition of slavery in the British Empire, which he did not see, with the 1833 Slavery Abolition Act receiving Royal Ascent the week after his death, in July 1833.

Architecture
A plantation house served to group the owner's family, guests, and house slaves within one large structure in a central location on the estate. Often starting as a modest abode, the house was enlarged or replaced with a newer, more impressive home as the planter's wealth grew. Commonly seen is the addition of massive Greek Revival columns, curved stairs, semi-detached wings, and other architectural elements popular at the time.

French colonial

The French origins of planters in Canada, Louisiana, and Saint-Domingue heavily influenced the development of French colonial architecture, characterized by its wide hipped roofs extending over wraparound porches, thin wooden columns, and living quarters raised above ground level. Learning building practices from the West Indies, colonists designed practical dwellings for a territory prone to flooding.

A notable loss of plantation homes in Louisiana is attributed to an economic shift from agriculture to industry during the Reconstruction era.

Georgian
Georgian architecture was widely disseminated in the Thirteen Colonies during the Georgian era. American buildings of the Georgian period were very often constructed of wood with clapboards; even columns were made of timber, framed up, and turned on an oversized lathe. At the start of the period, the difficulties of obtaining and transporting brick or stone made them a common alternative only in the larger cities or where they were obtainable locally.

A premier example of Georgian planter architecture is Westover Plantation, built in the mid-18th century as the residence of William Byrd III, the son of the founder of the Richmond, Virginia. An elaborate doorway, which is recognized as "the Westover doorway," adorns the main entrance and contrasts an otherwise simple construction. During the American Civil War, the house served as the headquarters of Union General Fitz John Porter, the protégé of George McClellan, who was stationed at nearby Berkeley Plantation, and purportedly had its east wing struck by a Confederate cannonball fired from the south side of the James River. The wing caught fire and lay in ruin until Mrs. Clarise Sears Ramsey, a Byrd descendant, purchased the property in 1899. She was instrumental in modernizing the house, rebuilding the east wing, and adding hyphens to connect the main house to the previously separate dependencies, thereby creating one long building.

Palladian

Introduced to the continent by George Berkeley in the 1720s, Palladian architecture became popular with American society in the construction of colleges and public buildings, while many houses too were built in the Jefferson Paladian style of Monticello. Andrea Palladio developed Palladianism in the 16th century, publishing in 1570 Quattro Libri, a treatise on architecture in four volumes and illustrated with woodcuts after Palladio's own drawings.

Covered and columned porches feature prominently in Palladian architecture, in many cases dominating the main facade. Red brick exteriors and either slanted or domed roofs are commonplace among residential buildings.

Monticello, residence of US President Thomas Jefferson, was built in a style unique to him that has been emulated in the construction of many colleges, such as The Rotunda of the University of Virginia, as well as churches, courthouses, concert halls, and military schools.

Bibliography

See also
 Colonial families of Maryland
 First Families of Virginia
 Plantation complexes in the Southern United States

References

 
American upper class
Culture of the Southern United States
Gentry
High society (social class)
History of the United States
American slave owners